Milan Šamko (born 1946 in Leipzig) is a German pianist and keyboardist. In the 1980s, he became a sought-after studio musician of the GDR.

Biography 
Šamko studied piano and composition at the Hochschule für Musik "Hanns Eisler" in Berlin. From the mid-1960s, jazz and blues became more and more a passion for him. He was primarily devoted to playing the music and listening to his favorite classics of Herbie Hancock, Miles Davis, or Keith Jarrett. Samko then advanced through his very own style of writing and improvising as a jazz musician. He has worked as a soloist on the Hammond organ as well as in the radio big band.

In addition to his appearances in bands, since GDR-times to this day, he has frequently accompanied the diseuse Sonja Kehler - both on stage and on record - for a CD with a new Else Lasker-Schüler setting.

Samko, who now lives near Potsdam and teaches piano lessons, has been part of the blues band Passover Blues since the mid-1990s.

References

External links 
 Porträt (Pass over Blues)
 Milan Samko on Discogs
 Discography (Naxos)

German jazz pianists
German jazz composers
Male jazz composers
Musicians from Leipzig
1946 births
Living people
German male pianists
21st-century pianists
21st-century German male musicians